Nicole Prause is an American neuroscientist researching human sexual behavior, addiction, and the physiology of sexual response. She is also the founder of Liberos LLC, an independent research institute.

Education and career 
Prause obtained her doctorate in 2007 at Indiana University Bloomington, with joint supervision by the Kinsey Institute for Research in Sex, Gender, and Reproduction. Her areas of concentration were neuroscience and statistics. Her clinical internship, in neuropsychological assessment and behavioral medicine, was with the VA Boston Healthcare System's Psychology Internship Training Program. Her research fellowship was in couples' treatment for alcoholism with Timothy O'Farrell at Harvard University.

Prause became a tenure track faculty member at Idaho State University at the age of 29. After three years there, she accepted a position as a Research Scientist at the Mind Research Network, a neuroimaging facility in Albuquerque, New Mexico. In 2012, Prause was elected a full member of the International Academy of Sex Research and accepted a position as a Research Scientist on faculty at the University of California, Los Angeles in the David Geffen School of Medicine. While there, she was promoted to Associate Research Scientist in 2014. Institutional attitudes towards sex research and ongoing safety threats from anti-porn organizations prompted her to found Liberos LLC in 2015. This private research institute and biotechnology company is funded entirely by grants from the federal government and private grants. She is also a licensed psychologist in California.

Science communication 
Prause has appeared in media education about sexual science, including: PBS Nova Secret Lives of Scientists, Today Show for Orgasmic Meditation and After Porn Ends 2.

Brain stimulation to alter sexual desire
Prause was the lead author on the first study to apply brain stimulation to alter sexual responsiveness, using a high frequency form known as Theta Burst Stimulation (TBS). This study was also the first in the US to use primary sexual rewards in the laboratory, adopting from a history of this approach in European laboratories, to overcome the problem of sex films used as secondary reinforcers in previous research. This is thought to raise new possibilities for intervention for those with high or low sex drive, which could be altered semi-permanently by repeated TBS.

Sex addiction studies
Prause co-authored a study on the neurophysiology of porn addiction published in 2013, which concluded that hypersexuality might be better understood as a "non-pathological variation of high sexual desire", rather than an addiction. The suspect in the 2021 Atlanta spa shootings claimed to be addicted to pornography and sex, but Prause has stated that there is no scientific consensus that sort of addiction exists.

Penile size preference study
In collaboration with psychologist Geoffrey Miller at the Mind Research Network, a neuroimaging facility in Albuquerque, Prause conducted a study in 2015 (N = 75) concerning women's preference in penis size, their preference across different kinds of relationships, and how important they considered penis size in the context of traits in a male partner. The study was the first to use 3d printed penes to rummage through and handle, rather than flat images. Results suggested that most women preferred a penis only slightly larger than average size, that their preference differs slightly across different types of relationships, and that they found penis size to be relatively unimportant in a partner, less important than cooking skills or dress, and only more important than eye color and car type. Twenty percent of participants reported never having experienced sexual intercourse prior to the start of the study. A similar percentage reported having ended a relationship "in part" because of penis size.

Notes

References

External links 

21st-century American women scientists
American neuroscientists
American sexologists
American women neuroscientists
Indiana University Bloomington alumni
Living people
Women sexologists
1978 births